Proof is an Irish television series, co-produced by Subotica for broadcast on RTÉ; it was first broadcast on 5 January 2004. Starring Finbar Lynch and Orla Brady as investigative journalists Terry Corcoran and Maureen Boland, Proof lasted for two series, with a second series, subtitled Prescription for Murder, airing in April 2005. The series was a co-production with TV2 of Denmark, and as such, both series were broadcast in the region in 2006. Likewise, both series aired on PBS in the United States and were released on DVD in January and April 2007. In 2009, both series were broadcast by Scottish broadcaster STV.

The first series was directed by Ciaran Donnelly and the second by Thaddeus O'Sullivan. Tristan Lynch and Mary Callery acted as executive producers. Both series were filmed on location in Ireland. The series was a hit with critics and audiences alike, and became a ratings success for RTÉ, becoming the channel's most watched drama in 2004, beating off soap opera Fair City. Orla Brady also received an Irish Film and Television Award nomination for Best Actress in a TV serial in 2004, and the first series was also up for nomination for best TV serial.

Production
Proof was created by Tony Philpott, who also wrote the first two episodes of the first series. Proof notably made headlines when it was discovered that Philpott's original screenplay had been "dumbed down" by network executives and some of the more politically critical elements had been removed. The screenplay was read by a Sunday Times TV critic, who noted the excisions and wrote about them in an article separate to his TV column.

The column, printed on 1 February 2004, wrote: "It could almost be the plot of a whodunit. A television station commissions a hard-hitting drama set against the sleazy backdrop of Irish political corruption. The designated writer delivers the goods with a script that station bigwigs hail as one of the grittiest and most convincing they’ve ever read. Then, somewhere between the green-lighting of the project and the first day of principal photography, the script is eviscerated. It's astringent depiction of crooked politics, Irish-style, is watered down to bland, generic mush."

Cast
 Finbar Lynch as Terry Corcoran
 Orla Brady as Maureen Boland
 Charlotte Bradley as Detective Dolores Quirke
 Sidse Babett Knudsen as Nina Kurpreka (Series 1)
 Stuart Graham as Andrew O'Hara (Series 1)
 Bryan Murray as Miles Carrick (Series 1)
 Cathy Belton as Kay Corcoran (Series 1)
 Jim Norton as Ronan Corcoran (Series 1)
 Emma Bolger as Orla Boland (Series 1)
 Declan Conlan as Detective Larry Mitchell (Series 1)
 Kate O'Toole as Olivia Bernstein (Series 2)
 Dearbhla Molloy as Evelyn Boland (Series 2)
 Saoirse Ronan as Orla Boland (Series 2)
 Stanley Townsend as Patrick Mooney (Series 2)
 Conor Mullen as J.P. O'Farrell (Series 2)

Episodes

Series 1 (2004)

Series 2: Prescription for Murder (2005)

References

External links

2004 Irish television series debuts
2005 Irish television series endings
Proof
RTÉ original programming